The Little Cedar Formation is a geologic formation in Illinois. It preserves fossils dating back to the Devonian period.

See also

 List of fossiliferous stratigraphic units in Illinois

References
 

Devonian Iowa
Devonian Illinois
Devonian Missouri
Devonian southern paleotemperate deposits